Marianne Schröder is a Norwegian model. She was born in Smøla, Norway on 11 March 1977.

Career
Schröder has modeled for Ambiente, Boss by Hugo Boss, Celine, Jil Sander, Lacoste, Marc O'Polo, and Missoni, and has been on the cover of Vogue.  Schröder can be seen in the Röyksopp music video for the song "What Else Is There?". Schröder also graced the inaugural cover of Vogue Portugal in November 2002.

References

External links 
FMD profile photos

1977 births
Living people
Norwegian female models